These are the official results of the 2011 Central American and Caribbean Championships in Athletics which took place on July 15–17, 2011 in Mayagüez, Puerto Rico.

Men's results

100 meters

Heats – July 15Wind:Heat 1: −0.9 m/s, Heat 2: −1.5 m/s, Heat 3: −1.3 m/s, Heat 4: −1.8 m/s, Heat 5: −1.3 m/s

Final – July 15Wind:−0.5 m/s

200 meters

Heats – July 16Wind:Heat 1: +0.9 m/s, Heat 2: +1.1 m/s, Heat 3: +0.7 m/s, Heat 4: +1.5 m/s

Final – July 17Wind:+1.1 m/s

400 meters

Heats – July 15

Final – July 15

800 meters

Heats – July 15

Final – July 16

1500 meters
July 15

5000 meters
July 16

10,000 meters
July 15

Half marathon
July 17

110 meters hurdles

Heats – July 17Wind:Heat 1: −3.9 m/s, Heat 2: −3.5 m/s

Final – July 17Wind:+0.7 m/s

400 meters hurdles

Heats – July 15

Final – July 16

3000 meters steeplechase
July 16

4 × 100 meters relay
Heats – July 16

Final – July 16

4 × 400 meters relay
July 17

20,000 meters walk
July 17

High jump
July 17

Pole vault
July 16

Long jump
July 16

Triple jump
July 17

Shot put
July 15

Discus throw
July 15

Hammer throw
July 15

Javelin throw
July 16

Decathlon
July 15–16

Women's results

100 meters

Heats – July 15Wind:Heat 1: −1.5 m/s, Heat 2: −1.4 m/s, Heat 3: −1.6 m/s

Final – July 15Wind:+0.5 m/s

200 meters

Heats – July 16Wind:Heat 1: +0.1 m/s, Heat 2: −0.1 m/s, Heat 3: +0.4 m/s, Heat 4: +1.1 m/s

Final – July 17Wind:+1.4 m/s

400 meters

Heats – July 15

Final – July 15

800 meters

Heats – July 16

Final – July 17

1500 meters
July 15

5000 meters
July 16

Half marathon
July 17

100 meters hurdles

Heats – July 15Wind:Heat 1: −3.3 m/s, Heat 2: −3.8 m/s, Heat 3: −1.9 m/s

July 17Wind:+0.9 m/s

400 meters hurdles

Heats – July 15

Final – July 16

3000 meters steeplechase
July 17

4 × 100 meters relay
July 16

4 × 400 meters relay
July 17

10,000 meters walk
July 17

High jump
July 16

Pole vault
July 15

Long jump
Final – July 17

Triple jump
July 15

Shot put
July 17

Discus throw
July 15

Hammer throw
July 15

Javelin throw
July 17

Heptathlon
July 16–17

References

Central American and Caribbean Championships
Events at the Central American and Caribbean Championships in Athletics